The Department of Conservation (DOC; Māori: Te Papa Atawhai) is the public service department of New Zealand charged with the conservation of New Zealand's natural and historical heritage.

An advisory body, the New Zealand Conservation Authority (NZCA) is provided to advise DOC and its ministers.  In addition there are 15 conservation boards for different areas around the country that provide for interaction between DOC and the public.

Function

Overview 

The department was formed on 1 April 1987, as one of several reforms of the public service, when the Conservation Act 1987 was passed to integrate some functions of the Department of Lands and Survey, the Forest Service and the Wildlife Service. This act also set out the majority of the department's responsibilities and roles.

As a consequence of Conservation Act all Crown land in New Zealand designated for conservation and protection became managed by the Department of Conservation. This is about 30% of New Zealand's land area or about 8 million hectares of native forests, tussocklands, alpine areas, wetlands, dunelands, estuaries, lakes and islands, national forests, maritime parks, marine reserves, nearly 4000 reserves, river margins, some coastline, and many offshore islands. All of the land under its control is protected for either conservation, ecological, scenic, scientific, historic or cultural reasons, and for recreation.

Providing for recreation is a major part of its core work, and this covers the management of family picnic sites, as well as maintaining rugged backcountry tracks and over 1000 accompanying backcountry huts that are used by hunters and recreational trampers. DOC also administers the Nature Heritage Fund, and is responsible for rural fire control.

In addition to its work managing land and providing for recreation in New Zealand, DOC works to preserve its natural heritage. This includes preservation of historic sites on public conservation land, saving native threatened species, managing threats like pests and weeds, environmental restoration, caring for marine life, and assisting landowners to effectively preserve natural heritage.

The methods of achieving these goals have resulted in controversy, where some people claim that the Department of Conservation is overly biased towards environmentalists at the expense of New Zealand's economy. This is particularly a concern amongst some farmers and other industries that are major users of neighbouring land, many of whom have been affected by decisions of the department. However, these criticised DOC efforts have also been lauded for achieving some success, for both conservationists and farmers, having led to a significant drop in possum populations during the last decades.

The DOC was floated as the agency to supervise the construction of the proposed New Zealand Cycleway, though this is now being managed primarily by the Ministry of Tourism, in coordination with the DOC where appropriate.

After a number of years of falling budgets, in 2013 the department announced it would be slashing 140 jobs and narrowing its 11-region structure into six.

Headquarters
The Department of Conservation moved into a new headquarters, Conservation House, on Manners Street, Wellington in 2006. It is the first green building in New Zealand to be given a 5-star rating, having won numerous environmental awards, including a top 10 placing by Grist Magazine. The site was originally a cinema complex operated by the Hoyts Group from the mid-1980s until the early 2000s, when it closed down in the face of stiff competition.

Conservation land 
New Zealand has 13 national parks, and a wide number of other conservation lands with varying levels of environmental protection, called the "conservation estate" in total. About one third of this estate, generally the land considered most valuable, has been protected from mining since 1997 via being listed in Schedule 4 of the Crown Minerals Act 1991 (though recent (2010) moves by the Fifth National Government have proposed exemption some areas from Schedule 4).

While much of the conservation land not protected as national parks or Schedule 4 land is much more damaged or human-modified than the core conservation areas, these areas serve as boundary and species buffer zones.

Incidents

Cave Creek disaster

In 1995, 14 people died when a viewing platform maintained by the Department of Conservation collapsed. Immediately following the tragedy, all of the department's 106 viewing platforms throughout New Zealand were checked. Fifteen platforms were closed for repairs.

A Commission of Inquiry that followed the tragedy revealed that the department had acted illegally and negligently in constructing the viewing platform. The commission also stated that the department was seriously underfunded for the tasks with which it was delegated, resulting in a culture of sub-standard safety procedures having been used for the building and maintenance of some of its facilities.

Many people in New Zealand criticised the government for the department's situation, and Denis Marshall, the presiding Minister of Conservation at the time, eventually resigned over the incident. Since the inquiry, radical changes have been made to the department's procedures to prioritise safety, including the implementation of a comprehensive asset management system to catalogue, track and trigger regular inspections of all significant structures and facilities managed by the department.

Raoul Island eruption

In March 2006, a volcanic eruption at the Green Lake of Raoul Island, administered by the Department of Conservation, was believed to have killed DOC worker Mark Kearney. At the exact time of the eruption, Kearney is thought to have been taking temperature measurements of the lake as part of a programme for monitoring volcanic activity. Five other DOC workers, who were also living on the island, were forced to evacuate back to New Zealand shortly after the eruption. Searches for Kearney, which have been inhibited by the island's remote location and the risks of further volcanic activity, have since failed to find any signs of him.

List of directors-general
Directors-General of DOC (Chief Executive) are:

See also
Biodiversity of New Zealand
Conservation in New Zealand
National parks of New Zealand
Forest parks of New Zealand
New Zealand Great Walks
Regional parks of New Zealand
Tramping in New Zealand
Australasian Fire and Emergency Service Authorities Council
1080 usage in New Zealand, of which DOC is one of the largest users.

References

External links

 
 Conservation blog The department's blog

1987 establishments in New Zealand
New Zealand Public Service departments
Department of Conservation
Environmental protection
New Zealand
Environmental agencies
Forestry in New Zealand